Nicholas Joel Mabodoko, is a Zimbabwean politician.

Prior to independence he chaired the Joint African Advisory Board. He became the first black chairman of the African Advisory Board in 1975. After independence, he served as PF-ZAPU mayor of Bulawayo from 1985 to 1988, becoming a member of ZANU-PF following the unification of the two parties in 1987. During the Bulawayo mayoral elections of 2001, he clashed with Jonathan Moyo over alleged vote-buying.

He served as chairman of the state bus company ZUPCO until 2001.
The government of Zimbabwe declared him a Liberation War hero and was buried with honours. In the 1970s he was Chairman of Bulawayo African Football Association (BAFA)

See also
 List of mayors of Bulawayo
 Timeline of Bulawayo

References

1922 births
2007 deaths
Mayors of Bulawayo
ZANU–PF politicians